Loivre station (French: Gare de Loivre) is a railway station in the commune of Loivre, Marne department in northern France. The station is located at kilometric point (KP) 11.219 on the Reims-Laon railway and served by TER Grand Est trains operated by the SNCF.

In 2018, the SNCF recorded 27,644 passenger movements through the station.

References 

Railway stations in Marne (department)
Railway stations in France opened in 1857